The 1923 Frankford Yellow Jackets season was their last independent season before joining the National Football League. The team finished the year with 9-2-2 record.

Schedule

References
 Asterisk denotes a game against an NFL member in 1923.

Frankford Yellow Jackets seasons